Rumarz-e Olya (also Romanized as Rūmarz-e ‘Olyā and Rūmorz-e ‘Olyā; also known as Roomarz, Rūmārz Bālā, Rūmarz-e Bālā, and Rūmorz-e Bālā) is a village in Eslamabad Rural District, in the Central District of Jiroft County, Kerman Province, Iran. At the 2006 census, its population was 806, in 161 families.

References 

Populated places in Jiroft County